The 2017 Porsche Mobil 1 Supercup was the 25th Porsche Supercup season. It began on 13 May at Circuit de Catalunya and finished on 29 October at Autódromo Hermanos Rodríguez, after eleven scheduled races, all of which were support events for the 2017 Formula One season.

Rule changes for 2017

Technical
The outgoing Porsche 911 GT3 Cup (Type 991) car fleet was replaced by Porsche 911 GT3 Cup (Type 991.2) for all Porsche Supercup entrants from 2017 to 2020 seasons.
Gasoline direct injection became mandatory fuel feed for full time series entrants as Porsche 911 GT3 Cup (Type 991.2) car utilized the all-new MA1.76/MDG.G petrol engines as electronic multipoint indirect fuel injection officially phased out after twenty-four seasons.

Teams and drivers
Full list of drivers that will participate in the 2017 season:

Race calendar

Championship standings

Drivers' Championship

Notes
† – Drivers did not finish the race, but were classified as they completed over 75% of the race distance.

Nations Championship

 Winners in bold

References

External links
 
 Porsche Mobil 1 Supercup Online Magazine

Porsche Supercup seasons
Porsche Supercup